Ecklund is a surname. Notable people with the surname include:

Brad Ecklund (1922–2010), center in the AAFC and in the National Football League
Daryl Ecklund (born 1985), American motocross rider
Elaine Howard Ecklund, Autrey Professor of Sociology at Rice University
Peter Ecklund (born 1945), American jazz cornetist

de:Ecklund